Marinka Raion was a raion (district) of Donetsk Oblast (province) located in eastern Ukraine. Its administrative center was the city of Marinka. The raion was abolished on 18 July 2020 as part of the administrative reform of Ukraine, which reduced the number of raions of Donetsk Oblast to eight, of which only five were controlled by the government.

The district was created on February 19, 1923 as part of the Ukrainian Soviet Socialist Republic.

Its population was 90,045 as of the 2001 Ukrainian Census. The district itself consisted of a total of 58 populated settlements, of which three are cities, three are urban-type settlements, 50 are selos, and an additional two are selysche. Since 2014, a small area in the east of the raion was under control of the Donetsk People's Republic. To facilitate the administration, both the Ukrainian government and the authorities of the Donetsk People's Republic transferred this area to other administrative units, so that the amended area of the raion until 2020 was under control of the government.

Demographics
According to the 2001 Ukrainian Census:

See also
 Administrative divisions of Ukraine

References

External links
 
 

Former raions of Donetsk Oblast
1923 establishments in Ukraine
Ukrainian raions abolished during the 2020 administrative reform